Thomas Sampson, better known as TS7, is a British DJ, record producer, remixer and songwriter.

Early life
Thomas Sampson was born and raised in Bradford, England. He was introduced to DJing and garage music at an early age and began to play in local nightclubs within the garage and bassline club scene.

It was from a young age that he realised had a huge interest in music. From the age of just 5, his parents encouraged him to have piano lessons. He went on to achieve grade 5 by the time he was 13. Producing started at the young age of 14, when he managed to get hold of the software ‘Fruityloops’ (now known as FL Studio).

Alongside production, he has toured and played shows across the world including Australia, New Zealand, Spain, Ibiza, Turkey and Czech Republic. He’s also played festivals including Glastonbury, Reading & Leeds, Parklife and Creamfields.

Music career

In 2007 TS7 signed to Agent X’s UK Garage label, Heatseeker Recordings. His releases on Heatseeker included Smile which provided him with his first breakthrough and led to an official remix of  Estelle's number 1 single "American Boy" for Warner Records.

Throughout 2008 TS7 worked on a number of remixes and was featured on the breakthrough, genre-defining bassline compilations Sound of Bassline 1 + 2

In March 2018 TS7 released Real Raver with Slick Don independently, the track has gone on to stream over 25 million plays.

In 2019 TS7’s remix of James Hype’s  I Was Lovin U provided a breakthrough moment in the new wave of bass music - it has since reached over 15 million streams.

In 2020 TS7 signed with Fuego Management who also represent NOTION, Holy Goof and Y U QT.

He self-released a series of singles throughout 2021 via Believe which culminated in the release of Slow Down EP in January 2022. The single Slow Down has had 5 million streams and was playlisted at Kiss Dance and Capital Dance. Alongside this he launched his new live show TS7 LIVE and embarked on a headline tour across the UK.

In the summer of 2022 he released a new single Know My Name and played a number of festival dates which included a set on the BBC Radio 1 Dance Stage at Reading And Leeds. He also released a remix of Bru-C’s No Excuses on 0207 Def Jam.

Discography
 TS7 feat. T.Dot - Raise Your Glasses
 TS7 feat. Tonia - Smile
 TS7 feat. Taylor Fowlis (Tayá) - "Heartlight (Polygon)"
 TS7 - Reach
 TS7 - The Receptive EP
 TS7 - Mood Swings
 TS7 - All Night Long
 TS7 - Don’t Play Yourself
 TS7 - Hulk
 TS7 - Judo
 TS7 - Motion Shift (Remixes)
 TS7 - Carbon Flare
 TS7 -  I Could Be The One
 TS7 - Lacuna
 TS7 feat. Slick Don - Real Raver
 TS7 - Emotion
 TS7 - Something Else
 TS7 - Skanker
 TS7 - So High/Raptor
 TS7 - All My Love
 TS7 - Slow Down
 TS7 - Know My Name

Collaborations
 Skepsis & TS7 - Freak
 Holy Goof & TS7 - Over You

Remixes
 Estelle - "American Boy"
 Tujamo & Plastic Funk - "Dr. Who"
 I Am - “I’m A Miracle”
 IV Rox - “I Heard Love”
 DJ Q - “Trust Again”
 Ashea - “Let You Go”
 SugaRush Beat Company - “L-O-V-E”
 Baby Blue - "Bump"
 Tulisa - “Sight Of You”
 Disciples x Eyelar - “All Mine”
 Fuse ODG - "Antenna"
 Sigma - "Nobody to Love"
 Sigala - “Say You Do”
 Roll Deep - “All Or Nothing”
 James Hype - “I Was Lovin’ You”
 Bru-C - “No Excuses”

References

Living people
UK garage musicians
Year of birth missing (living people)
Musicians from Bradford
English DJs
English record producers
Remixers
Electronic dance music DJs